The 2019 Shenzhen Longhua Open was a professional tennis tournament played on hard courts. It was the third (men) and fourth (women) editions of the tournament which was part of the 2019 ATP Challenger Tour and the 2019 ITF Women's World Tennis Tour. It took place in Shenzhen, China between 28 October and 10 November 2019.

Men's singles main-draw entrants

Seeds

 1 Rankings are as of 21 October 2019.

Other entrants
The following players received wildcards into the singles main draw:
  Cui Jie
  Gao Xin
  Li Yuanfeng
  Mo Yecong
  Wang Chuhan

The following player received entry into the singles main draw using a protected ranking:
  Nicolás Barrientos

The following player received entry into the singles main draw as an alternate:
  Jonáš Forejtek

The following players received entry from the qualifying draw:
  Duan Jiaqi
  Fabien Reboul

The following players received entry as lucky losers:
  Toshihide Matsui
  Matej Sabanov

Women's singles main-draw entrants

Seeds

 1 Rankings are as of 21 October 2019

Other entrants
The following players received wildcards into the singles main draw:
  Liu Chang
  Wang Danni
  Zhang Ying
  Zheng Wushuang

The following player received a special exempt into the singles main draw:
  Arina Rodionova

The following players received entry from the qualifying draw:
  Liu Fangzhou
  Chihiro Muramatsu
  Peangtarn Plipuech
  Urszula Radwańska
  Sofia Shapatava
  Daria Snigur
  Xun Fangying
  You Xiaodi

Champions

Men's singles

 Zhang Zhizhen def.  Li Zhe 6–3, 4–6, 6–1.

Women's singles

 Zhu Lin def.  Peng Shuai, 6–3, 1–3, ret.

Men's doubles

 Hsieh Cheng-peng /  Yang Tsung-hua def.  Mikhail Elgin /  Ramkumar Ramanathan 6–2, 7–5.

Women's doubles

 Nao Hibino /  Makoto Ninomiya def.  Sofia Shapatava /  Emily Webley-Smith, 6–4, 6–0

References

2019 ATP Challenger Tour
2019 ITF Women's World Tennis Tour
2019 in Chinese tennis
Shenzhen Longhua Open
October 2019 sports events in China
November 2019 sports events in China